Sphaeralcea munroana is a species of flowering plant in the mallow family known by the common names Munro's globemallow and Munro's desert-mallow. It is native to the western United States, where it can be found in the Great Basin and surrounding regions. It grows in sagebrush, desert flats, mountain slopes, and requires plenty of sunlight to thrive. It is woolly and gray-green in color. The alternately arranged leaves have triangular blades up to 6 cm long, usually edged with large lobes and a toothed margin. Flowers occur in clusters on a raceme-like inflorescence. The flower has five apricot to red-orange petals each just over 1 cm long.

References

External links
Jepson Manual Treatment
Washington Burke Museum
Photo gallery

munroana
Flora of the Northwestern United States
Flora of the Southwestern United States
Flora of California
Flora of the Sierra Nevada (United States)
Flora without expected TNC conservation status